The 2008 Omega Mission Hills World Cup took place from 27 November to 30 November at Mission Hills Golf Club in Shenzhen, China. It was the 54th World Cup. 28 countries competed and each country sent two players. The team purse was $5,000,000 with $1,600,000 going to the winner. The Swedish team of Robert Karlsson and Henrik Stenson won the tournament. This was the second time that Sweden won the World Cup.

Qualification and format
The leading 18 available players from the Official World Golf Ranking on 1 September 2008 qualified. These 18 players then selected a player from their country to compete with them. The person they pick had to be ranked within the top 100 on the Official World Golf Ranking as of 1 September. If there was no other player from that country within the top 100 then the next highest ranked player would be their partner. If there was no other available player from that country within the top 500, then the exempt player could choose whoever he wants as long as they are a professional from the same country. World qualifiers were held in September and October. Nine countries earned their spot in the World Cup, three each from the European, Asian, and South American qualifiers. The host country, China, rounded out the field.

The event is a 72-hole stroke play team event with each team consisting of two players. The first and third days are four-ball play and the second and final days are foursomes play.

Teams

Source

Scores

Source

References

External links
Coverage on the PGA Tour's official site
Mission Hills Golf Club

World Cup (men's golf)
Golf tournaments in China
Sports competitions in Guangdong
Sport in Shenzhen
World Cup (men's)
World Cup golf
World Cup golf